Boleros is a compilation album released by Juan Gabriel on December 7, 2010.

Track listing

References 

Juan Gabriel albums
2010 compilation albums